Reality Binge is a weekly Fox Reality Channel original series which features reality TV clips & reality commentary every week. The show is hosted by Eric Toms.

History 
Reality Binge premiered on July 10, 2008 on Fox Reality Channel.

It aired its last episode on December 18, 2008.

Format 
Reality Binge features the host, Eric Toms, on a green screen set. The show incorporates various segments that focus on reality television shows on all television networks, both broadcast and cable.

References

External links
Official Page

Fox Broadcasting Company original programming
2008 American television series debuts
2008 American television series endings